Eric Anders Carlen is a mathematician who is a professor at Rutgers University – New Brunswick. He is a fellow of the American Mathematical Society since 2016, for "contributions to functional analysis, mathematical physics, and probability".

He obtained his Ph.D. from Princeton University in 1984 under the supervision of Edward Nelson.

References

External links
Personal page at Rutgers

20th-century American mathematicians
21st-century American mathematicians
Year of birth missing (living people)
Living people
Rutgers University faculty
Fellows of the American Mathematical Society
Princeton University alumni